Parabita is a town and comune in the Italian province of Lecce in the Apulia region of south-east Italy.

The town is the home of Banca Popolare di Lecce (ex-Banca Popolare di Parabita e Aradeo), which was merged with other bank to form Banca Popolare Pugliese.

Its history goes back to prehistoric times; neolithic era huts were uncovered but archeologists say there was a human presence here even before that.

References

Cities and towns in Apulia
Localities of Salento